Pego is a civil parish (freguesia) in the municipality (concelho) of Abrantes, in the historic Portuguese district of Santarém.

History
The parish, one of the older parishes in the municipality, was already identified in the records of that period, dating to 1332.

Geography
Pego is situated in the centre of the municipality of Abrantes; one of the three parishes that do not front other municipalities within Abrantes. Its neighbours include the parishes of Mouriscas (in the northeast); Concavada (in the east); São Facundo and São Miguel do Rio Torto (to the south), Rossio (to the west) and Alferrarede (in the northwest).

Leaving the main city of Abrantes, towards Portalgre on the EN118, following the left margin of the Tagus, intersects the civil parish of Pego. The road leads along the Ribeira de Coalhos to a small plateau with several small low-rise homes: the first indications of a small settled community.

Architecture

Civic
 Estate of Coalhos
 Estate of Torre
 House of Coalhos
 House of Pego
 Lagar of Pego
 Residence Rosado Gonçalves
 Windmill of Pego

Religious
 Chapel of Nossa Senhora dos Aflitos
 Church of Santa Luzia

References

Freguesias of Abrantes